Raeford is a city in Hoke County, North Carolina, United States. Its population was 4,611 at the 2010 census, and in 2018, the estimated population was 4,962. It is the county seat of Hoke County.

History

John McRae and A.A. Williford operated a turpentine distillery and general store, respectively. Each took a syllable from his name and came up with the name Raeford for the post office they established. The McRae family, who lived at the "ford of the creek", was at one time made up primarily of old Highland Scot families. Likewise, the Upper Cape Fear Valley of North Carolina was, in the 18th and 19th centuries, the largest settlement of Gaelic-speaking Highland Scots in North America. Today, many of these old families continue to live in the area, though their presence is noticeably diminished by the great numbers of newcomers to the area as a result of Fort Bragg. Since World War II, many Lumbee Indian families have moved northward from Robeson County and now constitute a significant element of the population that is otherwise European and African American.

The Hoke County Courthouse and Raeford Historic District are listed on the National Register of Historic Places.

Geography
Raeford is located in central Hoke County at  (34.981800, -79.227469). It is bordered to the northeast by Rockfish Creek, an east-flowing tributary of the Cape Fear River. The southern part of the city drains to Toneys Creek, a south-flowing component of the Lumber River–Pee Dee River–Waccamaw River watershed.

U.S. Route 401 runs through the north and west sides of Raeford, leading east  to Fayetteville and southwest  to Laurinburg. U.S. 401 Business passes through the center of town as Harris Avenue and East Central Avenue. North Carolina Highway 20 leaves the center of Raeford as St. Pauls Drive, leading southeast  to St. Pauls. North Carolina Highway 211 runs through the center of Raeford, entering from the south on Main Street and leaving to the west on Prospect Avenue; NC-211 leads south  to Lumberton and northwest  to Aberdeen.

Demographics

2020 census

As of the 2020 United States census, there were 4,559 people, 1,909 households, and 1,086 families residing in the city.

2000 census
As of the census of 2000,  3,386 people, 1,323 households, and 899 families resided in the city. The population density was 902.3 people per square mile (348.6/km). The 1,440 housing units averaged 383.7 per square mile (148.3/km). The racial makeup of the city was 52.75% White, 40.93% African American, 2.86% Native American, 0.95% Asian, 0.03% Pacific Islander, 1.09% from other races, and 1.39% from two or more races. Hispanics or Latinos of any race were 4.16% of the population.

Of the 1,323 households, 30.2% had children under the age of 18 living with them, 45.1% were married couples living together, 18.9% had a female householder with no husband present, and 32.0% were not families. About 29.6% of all households were made up of individuals, and 14.7% had someone living alone who was 65 years of age or older. The average household size was 2.40 and the average family size was 2.94.

In the city, the age distribution was 23.7% under 18, 7.3% from 18 to 24, 25.5% from 25 to 44, 23.7% from 45 to 64, and 19.7% who were 65 years of age or older. The median age was 41 years. For every 100 females, there were 84.9 males. For every 100 females age 18 and over, there were 77.9 males.

The median income for a household in the city was $31,306, and for a family was $33,772. Males had a median income of $27,060 versus $26,050 for females. The per capita income for the city was $16,093. About 18.6% of families and 22.0% of the population were below the poverty line, including 30.6% of those under age 18 and 13.6% of those age 65 or over.

Notable people

 Diamond and Silk — conservative Internet personalities
 George Floyd — born near Raeford October 1973; killed in Minneapolis in May 2020, during arrest by four police officers
 Eric Maynor — selected 20th overall by Utah Jazz in 2009 NBA Draft
 Gil McGregor — selected 89th overall by Cincinnati Royals in 1971 NBA Draft
 Terrell McIntyre — retired professional basketball player; two-time All-Euroleague First Team selection; reached Euroleague Final Four in 2008 with Montepaschi Siena
 Jim McMillian — selected 13th overall by Los Angeles Lakers in 1970 NBA Draft
 Kathy McMillan — former Olympic long jumper representing the United States
 Detrez Newsome, former NFL running back
 Ted Thomas Sr. — cleric with the Church of God in Christ
 Earl Wolff — football safety for NFL's Washington Redskins; played college football at North Carolina State; selected by Philadelphia Eagles in the fifth round of the 2013 NFL Draft

References

External links
 City of Raeford official website
 Raeford and Hoke Chamber of Commerce
 The News Journal

Cities in North Carolina
Cities in Hoke County, North Carolina
County seats in North Carolina
Sandhills (Carolina)
Fayetteville, North Carolina metropolitan area
Scottish-American culture in North Carolina